Donald Wheeler may refer to:

 Donald Niven Wheeler (1913–2002), social activist, teacher, member of the Communist Party, and accused Soviet spy
 Donald J. Wheeler, American author, statistician and expert in quality control